Bechis is an Italian surname. Notable people with the surname include:

Eleonora Bechis (born 1974), Italian politician
Marco Bechis (born 1955), Chilean-Italian film screenwriter, and director
Marta Bechis (born 1989), Italian volleyball player

See also
Bechi

Italian-language surnames